Mariya Ovechkina (born 1990) is a beauty contest contestant who won the title of Miss Irkutsk in 2009 and participated in the Miss Russia 2010 contest.

Biography 

She won the 2009 Miss Irkutsk contest. At the time she studied at the Baikal University of Economics and Law, in the modern dance program. Ovechkina was hoping to become an economist and entrepreneur, open her own restaurant in Irkutsk, and release a music album consisting of the songs from her pageant performances.

Contestants Miss Russia 2010

References

External links
 Official site for Miss Irkutsk

Russian beauty pageant winners
People from Irkutsk
1991 births
Living people